Stephen Dominic Bredhauer (born 15 February 1958) is a former Australian politician. Born in Brisbane, he was a teacher before entering politics. He joined the Labor Party in 1980. In 1989, he was elected to the Legislative Assembly of Queensland as the member for Cook. When Labor won government in 1998, he was appointed Minister for Transport and Main Roads, a position he held until his retirement from politics in 2004. He was succeeded by his electorate officer, Jason O'Brien.

References

1958 births
Living people
Members of the Queensland Legislative Assembly
Australian schoolteachers
People from Brisbane
Australian Labor Party members of the Parliament of Queensland
21st-century Australian politicians